Guy Ignolin (14 November 1936 – 15 December 2011) was a French professional road bicycle racer.  He was born in Vernou-sur-Brenne and died in Perros-Guirec, aged 75.

Major results

1959
Montmorillon
1960
Circuit d'Auvergne
1961
Circuit d'Auvergne
Tour de France:
Winner stage 10
1962
Circuit d'Auvergne
Grand Prix de Fourmies
1963
Tour de France:
Winner stages 11 and 14
Vuelta a España:
Winner stages 6 and 15
Guénin
Bain-de-Bretagne
1964
Combourg
Plévin
Plumelec
1965
Châteaulin
Circuit de l'Aulne
Circuit du Morbihan
Lescouet-Jugon
Perros-Guirec
1966
Pont-de-Bois
1967
Begard
Plancoët
Pleyber-Christ
Quemper-Guézennec
Iffendic
1968
Ruban Granitier Breton
1969
Plonevez-du-Faou

References

External links 

Official Tour de France results for Guy Ignolin

1936 births
2011 deaths
Sportspeople from Indre-et-Loire
French male cyclists
French Tour de France stage winners
French Vuelta a España stage winners
Cyclists from Centre-Val de Loire